Thierry Lhermitte (born 24 November 1952) is a French actor, director, writer and producer, best known for his comedic roles. He was a founder of the comedy troupe Le Splendid in the 1970s, along with, among others, Christian Clavier, Gérard Jugnot, and Michel Blanc. The group adapted a number of its stage hits for the cinema, and scored major successes with films such as Les Bronzés (1978), Les Bronzés font du ski (1979), Le Père Noël est une ordure (1982) and Un indien dans la ville (1994).

Honours and awards
In 1981, he received the Prix Jean Gabin. He was made Chevalier of the Légion d'honneur in 2001. He was made Officier of the Ordre national du Mérite in 2005.

Filmography

Actor

Selected writing credits
 2006: Les Bronzés 3: Amis pour la vie
 2000: Le prince du Pacifique
 1999: It's Not My Fault! (adaptation and dialogue)
 1997: Jungle 2 Jungle (earlier screenplay Un indien dans la ville)
 1994: Un indien dans la ville (adaptation)
 1991: Les secrets professionnels du Dr Apfelglück
 1986: Nuit d'ivresse
 1982: Le père Noël est une ordure
 1979: Les bronzés font du ski (as L'équipe du Splendid)
 1975: Le bol d'air (short as Le Splendid)
 1975: C'est pas parce qu'on a rien à dire qu'il faut fermer sa gueule... (original idea)
 1974: Bonne présentation exigée (short)

Notes

External links

Profile, allocine.fr (in French)

1952 births
Living people
People from Boulogne-Billancourt
French comedians
French male film actors
French film directors
French male stage actors
French male screenwriters
French screenwriters
Chevaliers of the Légion d'honneur
Officers of the Ordre national du Mérite
Lycée Pasteur (Neuilly-sur-Seine) alumni
20th-century French male actors
21st-century French male actors
French film producers
French people of Jewish descent